Ptosanthus aida is a species of tephritid or fruit flies in the genus Ptosanthus of the family Tephritidae.

Distribution
Ethiopia.

References

Tephritinae
Insects described in 1937
Diptera of Africa